Quessant (Tariwerwi or Ouessant) is an uninhabited island in the Louisiade Archipelago. Politically, it is part of Milne Bay Province in southeastern Papua New Guinea. Quessant is located 30 km southeast of Wari on the northeastern border of the coastal reef. The coral island is low and covered with delicious vegetation. Three reefs are located between Quessant and the Stuers Islands, about 16 km to the northwest.

Louis Antoine de Bougainville discovered the island on June 17, 1768, and named them for their resemblance to Ushant, the French island near Brest, the starting point of his circumnavigation.

References

Islands of Milne Bay Province
Louisiade Archipelago